Akodon albiventer, also known as the white-bellied grass mouse or white-bellied akodont, is a species of rodent in the family Cricetidae. It is found in the Andean highlands from southeastern Peru to southwestern Bolivia, northwestern Argentina, and far northeastern Chile at elevations from 2400 m to over 5000 m.

References

Literature cited
Dunnum, J., Vargas, J., Bernal, N., Zeballos, H., Vivar, E. & Patterson, B., Pardinas, U. and Jayat, J.P. 2008. . In IUCN. IUCN Red List of Threatened Species. Version 2009.2. <www.iucnredlist.org>. Downloaded on April 2, 2010.
Musser, G.G. and Carleton, M.D. 2005. Superfamily Muroidea. Pp. 894–1531 in Wilson, D.E. and Reeder, D.M. (eds.). Mammal Species of the World: a taxonomic and geographic reference. 3rd ed. Baltimore: The Johns Hopkins University Press, 2 vols., 2142 pp. 

Mammals of Argentina
Mammals of Bolivia
Mammals of Chile
Mammals of Peru
Akodon
Mammals described in 1897
Taxa named by Oldfield Thomas
Taxonomy articles created by Polbot